Alfred Ernest Beamish (6 August 1879 – 28 February 1944) was an English tennis player born in Richmond, Surrey, England. He finished runner-up to James Cecil Parke in the Men's Singles final of the Australasian Championships, the future Australian Open, in 1912. Beamish also partnered Charles Dixon to win the bronze medal in the indoor doubles event at the 1912 Stockholm Olympics. He was runner up in one of tennis early majors, the World Covered Court Championship, in 1921. He also competed at the 1920 Summer Olympics. He was also twice a semifinalist at Wimbledon in 1912 (where he beat Gordon Lowe before losing to Arthur Gore) and 1914 (where he lost to Norman Brookes). Beamish was married to Wimbledon singles semi finalist Winifred Beamish.

Grand Slam finals

Singles (1 runner-up)

Doubles (1 runner-up)

References

External links
 
 
 
 

1879 births
1944 deaths
English male tennis players
Olympic bronze medallists for Great Britain
Olympic medalists in tennis
Olympic tennis players of Great Britain
Tennis people from Greater London
Tennis players at the 1912 Summer Olympics
Tennis players at the 1920 Summer Olympics
Medalists at the 1912 Summer Olympics
British male tennis players
British Army personnel of World War I
Royal Army Service Corps soldiers